Early is a 2005 compilation by Scritti Politti which collects singles and EPs recorded in the first years of the band's existence, during its early incarnation as a DIY post-punk act characterised by an experimental musical approach and leftist political concerns. Following these recordings, leader Green Gartside would abandon the group's avant-garde leanings and attempt a more commercial musical direction.

Music
The group's sound on these early recordings has been described by AllMusic as "scrappy, taut, and forthrightly experimental in style, utilizing abrupt changes, rhythmic displacements, and gritty and discordant harmonies tempered by Gartside's sweet vocalizing of impenetrably obscure lyrics, vaguely political in sense but temporal and abstract in meaning." Pitchfork Media characterized these songs as "what happens when you combine Marxism, art school, and post-punk London, 1979: A rickety, alien pulse, as made by a band that insisted on printing the production costs of every single on the sleeve."

Track listing
All tracks written by Green Gartside, Nial Jinks, Keith Morley except tracks 12–13, written by Green Gartside.

Original releases

Tracks 1–3 from "Skank Bloc Bologna" single (1978)
Tracks 4–7 from Work in Progress 2nd Peel Session (1979)
Tracks 8–11 from 4 A Sides (1979)
Tracks 12–13 from The "Sweetest Girl" single (1981)

Personnel

Scritti Politti
Green Gartside – vocals, guitar
Nial Jinks – bass (tracks 1–11)
Tom Morley – drums (tracks 1–11)

Additional personnel
Robert Wyatt – piano (track 12)

References

2005 compilation albums
Scritti Politti albums
Rough Trade Records compilation albums
Post-punk compilation albums